Anne McLean (1962, Toronto) is a Canadian translator of Spanish literature. She began to learn Spanish in her late twenties and developed her language skills while living in Central America. Some years later in England, she took a master's degree in literary translation. McLean has translated a number of Spanish and Latin American authors, including Julio Cortázar, Javier Cercas, Evelio Rosero, Juan Gabriel Vásquez, and Carmen Martín Gaite, among others. Jointly with the author, she won the Independent Foreign Fiction Prize: in 2004 for her translation of Soldiers of Salamis and again in 2009 for The Armies by Evelio Rosero.

In 2014, her translation of Juan Gabriel Vásquez's The Sound of Things Falling was awarded the International Dublin Literary Award. She lives in Canada.

Awards and nominations 
 2004 Independent Foreign Fiction Prize for Soldiers of Salamis by Javier Cercas
 2009 Independent Foreign Fiction Prize for The Armies by Evelio Rosero
 2009 shortlisted for the Independent Foreign Fiction Prize for The Informers by Juan Gabriel Vasquez
 2013 shortlisted for the Independent Foreign Fiction Prize for Dublinesque by Enrique Vila-Matas (jointly translated with Rosalind Harvey).
 2014 International Dublin Literary Award for The Sound of Things Falling by  Juan Gabriel Vásquez

Selected translations 
 Carmen Martín Gaite – Living's the Strange Thing
 Eduardo Halfon – The Polish Boxer
 Daisy Rubiera Castillo – Reyita: The Life of a Black Cuban Woman in the Twentieth Century
 Enrique Vila-Matas – Dublinesque
 Enrique Vila-Matas – Never Any End to Paris
 Evelio Rosero – Good Offices
 Evelio Rosero – The Armies
 Héctor Abad – Recipes for Sad Women
 Hector Abad – Oblivion: a Memoir
 Ignacio Martínez de Pisón – To Bury the Dead
 Ignacio Padilla – Shadow Without a Name
 Isabel Allende – Maya's Notebook
 Javier Cercas – Soldiers of Salamis
 Javier Cercas – The Anatomy of a Moment
 Javier Cercas – The Speed of Light
 Javier Cercas – The Tenant and The Motive
 Juan Gabriel Vásquez – The Sound of Things Falling
 Juan Gabriel Vasquez – The Informers
 Juan Gabriel Vásquez – The Secret History of Costaguana
 Juan Gabriel Vásquez – The Shape of the Ruins
 Julio Cortázar – Autonauts of the Cosmoroute
 Julio Cortázar – Diary of Andrés Fava
 Paula Varsavsky – No One Said a Word
 Tomas Eloy Martínez – The Tango Singer

References 

Place of birth missing (living people)
Year of birth missing (living people)
Living people
Canadian translators
Writers from Toronto
Canadian women non-fiction writers
Literary translators
Spanish–English translators